Matthew Hadde  (c. 1544/5 – 8 August 1617), of St. Alphege, Canterbury, Kent and Lincoln's Inn, London, was an English politician.

He was a Member (MP) of the Parliament of England for Canterbury in 1604.

References

1544 births
1617 deaths
People from Canterbury
Members of Lincoln's Inn
English MPs 1604–1611